The Star-Ledger is the largest circulated newspaper in the U.S. state of New Jersey and is based in Newark. It is a sister paper to The Jersey Journal of Jersey City, The Times of Trenton and the Staten Island Advance, all of which are owned by Advance Publications.

In 2007, The Star-Ledgers daily circulation was reportedly more than the next two largest New Jersey newspapers combined, and its Sunday circulation was larger than the next three papers combined. It has suffered great declines in print circulation in recent years, to 180,000 daily in 2013, then to 114,000 "individually paid print circulation," which is the number of copies being bought by subscription or at newsstands, in 2015.

In July 2013, the paper announced that it would sell its headquarters building in Newark. In the same year, Advance Publications announced it was exploring cost-saving changes among its New Jersey properties, but was not considering mergers or changes in publication frequency at any of the newspapers, nor the elimination of home delivery.

History
The Newark Daily Advertiser, founded in 1832, was Newark's first daily newspaper. It subsequently evolved into the Newark Star-Eagle, owned by what eventually became Block Communications. S. I. Newhouse bought the Star-Eagle from Block in 1939 and merged it with the Newark Ledger to become the Newark Star-Ledger. The paper dropped Newark from its masthead sometime in the 1970s, but is still popularly called the Newark Star-Ledger by many New Jersey residents.

During the 1960s The Star-Ledgers chief competitor was the Newark Evening News, once the most popular newspaper in New Jersey. In March 1971, the Star-Ledger surpassed the Evening News in daily circulation, because the Newark News was on strike. The Evening News shut down in 1972.

After the Newark Evening News moved to a high-traffic area (with the potential of trapping its delivery trucks in inner-city traffic) the Star-Ledger opened a satellite plant in Piscataway. The Piscataway location offered quick access to Union, Monmouth, Somerset, and Middlesex counties.

The Star-Ledger was the recipient of the Pulitzer Prize for Breaking News Reporting in 2005 for its comprehensive coverage of the resignation of New Jersey Governor Jim McGreevey, after he confessed to adultery with a male lover.

The paper awards the Star-Ledger Trophy each year to the number one high school teams in their respective sport in New Jersey.

21st century: financial troubles
In 2005, George Arwady became the publisher of The Star-Ledger. A graduate of Columbia University, Arwady had previously been the publisher of the Kalamazoo Gazette in Kalamazoo, Michigan. Having worked closely with the Newhouse family for years, Arwady was asked to move to Newark to financially revamp the paper.

Due to financial losses, the paper's parent company Advance Publications announced on July 31, 2008 that it would sell the Star-Ledger unless 200 non-union staff voluntarily left under a buyout offer, and its unionized truck drivers and mailers agreed to concessions. On September 16, publisher George Arwady sent employees an email saying that management felt progress had been made on the buyout and concessions from the mailers, but that management is "far from an agreement with the Drivers' union." The email continued:
Since it is doubtful that the Drivers will ratify an agreement by October 8, 2008, we will be sending formal notices to all employees this week, as required by both federal and New Jersey law, advising you that the Company will be sold, or, failing that, that it will close operations on January 5, 2009.

On October 24, 2008, the newspaper announced that 168 newsroom employees had offered to take the company's buyout offer, and that the company had accepted 151 of them, which resulted in a 40% reduction in newsroom staff.

On January 16, 2013, the newspaper announced the layoffs of 34 employees including 18 newsroom staff.

In July, 2014, their Newark headquarters was sold to a New York developer, according to a news article released by the paper.

The Star-Ledger continues to publish seven days a week, and retains a presence in Newark in leased office space located within the downtown Gateway Center complex, where the publisher, the newspaper's editorial board, its columnists, its magazine staff and a handful of other jobs will be based. Advance Publications, the owner of the newspaper, launched a new media company — NJ Advance Media — in 2014 to provide content, advertising and marketing services for its online presence at NJ.com, and many of its New Jersey newspapers out of the offices in Woodbridge. The sales and marketing staffs moved to Woodbridge in June 2014.

Management

Presidents
 Amzi Armstrong (1832–?)
 William Burnet Kinney (?–1851)
 Thomas T. Kinney (1851–1895)
 James Smith, Jr. (1895–1915)
 Paul Block (1915–1939)
 Samuel Irving Newhouse, Sr. (1939–1979)
 Donald Newhouse (1979–Incumbent)

Publishers
 Richard Vezza

Executive editors
In October 2009, managing editor Kevin Whitmer took over as editor. After Whitmer left in September 2015, Richard Vezza assumed the position as editor.

Prior to Whitmer, James Willse manned the helm from 1995. He was appointed following the retirement of 32-year veteran editor Mort Pye. Willse was the former editor and publisher of the New York Daily News. Prior to accepting the Ledgers editorship, Willse headed the review of electronic information options for all Newhouse newspapers. He also expanded the Ledger use of color and encouraged a more aggressive editorial team. The National Press Foundation named Willse its 1999 recipient of the George Beveridge Editor of the Year Award in recognition of Ledgers coverage of racial profiling by the New Jersey State Police.

In popular culture
 The Star-Ledger was featured prominently various times in the hit television series The Sopranos, an HBO drama series set in New Jersey. Tony Soprano received home delivery of the paper, and several episodes opened with him picking it up at the end of his driveway.
The Sopranos creator David Chase credited a Star-Ledger story by journalist Guy Sterling with inspiring the theme for the series’ fifth season.
 The Star-Ledger serves as the inspiration for a fictional newspaper in an award-winning series of mystery novels by Brad Parks.
 The newspaper was referenced by comedian George Carlin in the 2004 comedy-drama Jersey Girl, which was written and directed by New Jersey native Kevin Smith.
 The Star-Ledger was also featured in Robert Kurson's 2004 novel Shadow Divers.
 The Star-Ledger was featured in the 2021  Showtime series  Yellowjackets.

See also 

 Beachgate
 Zan Stewart

References

External links
 The Star-Ledger (mobile)
 The Star-Ledger's Business Center

Advance Publications
Pulitzer Prize-winning newspapers
Daily newspapers published in the United States
Newspapers published in New Jersey
Mass media in Newark, New Jersey
Publications established in 1832